Tanzim Qaedat al-Jihad, also known as Al-Qaeda in the Malay Archipelago, is thought to be a militant splinter group of Southeast Asian Islamist group Jemaah Islamiya. It is thought to have been led by Noordin Mohammad Top.

References

Jemaah Islamiyah
Terrorism in Indonesia
Groups affiliated with al-Qaeda
Islamist groups
Paramilitary organizations based in Indonesia